SS John Mitchell was a steel-hulled, American lake freighter in service between 1907 and 1911. She was built in 1906 by the Great Lakes Engineering Works in St. Clair, Michigan, for the Cornell Steamship Company of Chicago, Illinois, which was managed by C.W. Elphicke. She entered service in 1907, and had a sister ship named William B. Davock. Throughout her career, John Mitchell carried iron ore and coal. On October 4, 1908, she ran aground at Indiana Harbor, Indiana, while loaded with iron ore.

On the morning of July 10, John Mitchell entered Lake Superior. A thick fog that hung over the lake severely reduced visibility. When she was off Vermilion Point, John Mitchell was inexplicably rammed in her port bow by the unladen bulk freighter William Henry Mack. Following the collision, John Mitchell immediately took on a list to port due to the rapid influx of water. After establishing that John Mitchell would not remain afloat, a ladder was placed between her deck and William Henry Macks deck. The majority of the passengers and crew climbed over to William Henry Mack, while six people escaped using a lifeboat, which eventually capsized; all of the people in the lifeboat were rescued. Three crewmen jumped overboard to aid in the rescue, but were sucked under and drowned when John Mitchell sank.

The wreck is protected by the Whitefish Point Underwater Preserve as part of an underwater museum.

History

Background
In 1843, the gunship USS Michigan, built in Erie, Pennsylvania, became the first iron-hulled vessel built on the Great Lakes. In the mid-1840s, Canadian companies began importing iron vessels prefabricated by shipyards in the United Kingdom. However, it would not be until 1862 that the first iron-hulled merchant ship, Merchant, was built on the Great Lakes. Despite the success of Merchant, wooden vessels remained preferable to iron ones until the 1880s, due to their inexpensiveness, and the abundance of timber. In the early 1880s, shipyards around the Great Lakes began to construct iron ships on a relatively large scale, and in 1884 the first steel freighters were built there. By the 1890s, the majority of ships constructed on the lakes were made of steel. The late 19th and early 20th centuries saw a rapid increase in the size of lake freighters; the first  freighter was built in 1895, the first  freighter was constructed five years later.

Design and construction

John Mitchell (US official number 203943) was built on the banks of the St. Clair River in 1906, by the St. Clair, Michigan, shipyard of the Great Lakes Engineering Works. She had a sister ship named William B. Davock, which succeeded her out of the shipyard. The only differences between John Mitchell and William B. Davock were their steering poles (John Mitchells was upright, fixed, and was adorned with a colourful orb, while William B. Davocks was a straight, hinged pole), and the size of their boilers (William B. Davocks boilers were  larger).

Steam for the engine was provided by two coal-fired, single-ended   by  Scotch marine boilers. The engine was built by the Great Lakes Engineering Works, while the boilers were manufactured by the Marine Boiler Works of Toledo, Ohio.

John Mitchell was named after Captain John Mitchell, a Canadian-American vessel owner and operator, and Cleveland, Ohio, resident who may also have had an interest in her. She was launched into the St. Clair River on November 28, 1906, as yard number 26. After she was launched, the shipyard worked through the remainder of 1906, and early 1907 to complete her, after which, they started building William B. Davock.

Service history

John Mitchell was built for the Cornell Steamship Company of Chicago, Illinois, which was managed by C.W. Elphicke (Elphicke & Company), also of Chicago. She was first enrolled at Port Huron, Michigan, on April 2, 1902. She was re-enrolled in Detroit, Michigan, on April 7, and was permanently enrolled in Cleveland on May 13. Her home port was Fairport, Ohio. John Mitchell entered service later in 1907. She carried coal on upbound voyages, and iron ore on downbound ones.

The only known incident in John Mitchells career prior to her loss occurred on October 14, 1908, when while loaded with iron ore from a Lake Superior port, she ran aground at the harbour entrance at Indiana Harbor, Indiana. The grounding occurred as a result of low water levels ( lower than usual), which were caused by strong winds that had been blowing for the previous 24 hours. John Mitchell sustained no damage, and was freed by the tugs G.W. Gnau and Tomlinson.

Final voyage
In addition to Captain Massey, there were 33 passengers and crew, including six women and a small boy on board.

Early on the morning of July 10, John Mitchell entered Lake Superior. As she was passing Ile Parisienne, she encountered fog, which heavily thickened by the time she passed Whitefish Point severely reducing visibility. There was no time to avoid the collision, with Captain Massey only managing to sound John Mitchells whistle once before William Henry Macks bow cut deeply into John Mitchells hull. Following the collision, John Mitchell immediately took on a list to port due to the rapid influx of water. John Mitchells foremast fell onto William Henry Macks deck, briefly keeping the two vessels together. After establishing that John Mitchell would not remain afloat, a ladder was placed between her stern deck and William Henry Macks deck.

The majority of the passengers and crew climbed over to William Henry Mack, while three men and three women escaped using a lifeboat. Seven minutes after the collision, John Mitchell capsized and sank. The suction created by her sinking capsized the lifeboat. Sixteen year-old passenger Fay Clemens, one of the six people in the overturned lifeboat was able to get William Henry Macks crew to throw her a line, which she fastened to the overturned lifeboat, enabling two crew of William Henry Mack to right it. As she was sinking, three crewmen, second officer Archie Causley, watchman George Austin and steward Albert "Al" Clemens, father of Fay Clemens jumped overboard to aid in the rescue, and were sucked under and drowned when John Mitchell sank. William Henry Mack remained afloat, and headed for Sault Ste. Marie, Michigan.

At $240,000 (equivalent to $ in ), John Mitchell was the worst insurance loss on the Great Lakes in 1911.

Investigation
An investigation conducted in Marquette, Michigan, by United States inspectors Charles M. Gooding and Charles M. York found Captain George H. Burnham of William Henry Mack largely responsible for the collision. Evidence given by Captain Massey and Captain Burnham regarding the fog signals conflicted. Captain Burnham claimed that he sounded the correct passing signals, while also claiming he heard no signals from John Mitchell. However, Captain Massey claimed that he exchanged the appropriate passing signals. Evidence given by the captains was supported by their respective crews. Captain Massey's licence was suspended for 30 days, while Captain Burnham's licence was suspended for 12 months.

John Mitchell today
Although resting upside-down, John Mitchells wreck is penetrable. The cargo holds, intact engine room, steering quadrant room, and some cabins are accessible. The engine room and steering quadrant room are accessible through a gangway located on the John Mitchells starboard side, near her stern. Mostly overlooked by divers, the wreck is protected by the  Whitefish Point Underwater Preserve as part of an underwater museum. The wreck of the steel freighter John B. Cowle is located east of John Mitchell. There is usually a mooring line on her rudder.

Notes

References

Sources

 
 
 
 
 
 
 
 
 
 
 
 
 
 
 
 
 
 
 
 
 
 
 

1906 ships
Maritime incidents in 1908
Maritime incidents in 1911
Shipwrecks of Lake Superior
Shipwrecks of the Michigan coast
Merchant ships of the United States
1972 archaeological discoveries
Ships built in St. Clair, Michigan
Great Lakes freighters
Wreck diving sites in the United States